Filip Benko (born 4 March 1986) is a Swedish actor of Croatian descent. While Benko studied at upper secondary technical school he recorded his first feature movie in 2004, Sandor slash Ida based on the novel with the same name by Sara Kadefors, he portrayed the part of Sandors older brother, Aron.

After his first movie Benko filmed a variety of short movies until the director  cast him as the lead in his first motion picture, Knäcka. Soon after, Benko was cast as the character Markus Niklasson in the TV-show Andra Avenyn.

Benko studied computer science at Royal Institute of Technology 2004-2008 and speaks Swedish, English and Serbo-Croatian fluently and speaks German intermediately.

Filmography
Sandor slash Ida - Aron (2004)
Drowning Ghost - Student (2004)
Livet enligt Rosa - Tompa (2005)
La-la-land - Eric (2007)
Vildsvinet - Arvid (2007)
Andra Avenyn - Marcus (2008)
Knäcka - Goran (2009)

Nominees and awards 
 Aftonbladets TV-pris - Nominated - Best male actor 2008
 Cosmopolitan Sweden - #2 of "Swedish top 10 sexiest males 2010"

References

External links

 Official website
 

1986 births
Living people
Swedish male actors
Swedish people of Croatian descent
People from Huddinge Municipality